The Princeton Tigers football program represents Princeton University and competes at the National Collegiate Athletic Association (NCAA) Division I Football Championship Subdivision (FCS) level as a member of the Ivy League. Princeton's football program—along with the football program at nearby Rutgers University—began in 1869 with a contest that is often regarded as the beginnings of American football.

History

First football game

Students from The College of New Jersey (now Princeton University) traveled to New Brunswick, New Jersey on November 6, 1869, to play Rutgers College (now Rutgers University) in a game using a modified version of London's Football Association rules. The game inlayers on each side and the round ball could only be advanced by kicking it. Rutgers won what has been called the first intercollegiate American football game 6–4. Taken literally, the Princeton/Rutgers game involved a 'foot' kicking a 'ball' (sort of like soccer), hence the term 'football' that gives rise to the Princeton/Rutgers match being considered as the first game of American 'football' between two American colleges.  A closer rendition of the modern game of football would come six years later in a match between Harvard and Tufts where the ball could only be advanced by running or passing, but not kicking it.  A week after the Princeton/Rutgers game, the Rutgers team traveled to Princeton for a rematch, which Princeton won 8–0.

Early history
Due in part to their invention of the sport, the Tigers were one of the dominant forces in the early days of intercollegiate football, winning 22 of the first 40 national titles (1869–1909). As the sport transformed at the hands of figures like Brown University's John Heisman and Yale's Walter Camp and more schools began competing, Princeton and the rest of the eventual Ivy League faded out of national championship contention. The Tigers won their last national championship in 1950 when Dick Kazmaier, the 1951 Heisman Trophy winner, was a junior.

Formation of the Ivy League
When Princeton joined Brown, Columbia, Cornell, Harvard, and Yale Universities, Dartmouth College, and the University of Pennsylvania in formally organizing the Ivy League athletic conference in 1955, conference rules prohibited post-season play in football. (Princeton never competed in the post-season.) The policy further insulated Princeton and the Ivy League from the national spotlight. Despite an undefeated season in 1964, Princeton was not among the top 10 teams in the season-ending Associated Press poll.

NCAA Division I subdivision split
The NCAA split Division I collegiate football into two subdivisions in 1978, then called I-A for larger schools, and I-AA for the smaller ones. The NCAA had devised the split, in part, with the Ivy League in mind, but the conference did not move down for 4 seasons. Unable to play competitively against long-time rival Rutgers anymore, Princeton stopped scheduling them as a football opponent after 1980. Then in 1982 the NCAA created a rule that stated a program's average attendance must be at least 15,000 to qualify for I-A membership. This forced the conference's hand, as only some of the member schools met the attendance qualification. Choosing to stay together rather than stand their ground separately in the increasingly competitive I-A subdivision, the Ivy League moved down into I-AA starting with the 1982 season. Despite often finishing its seasons ranked in the championship subdivision, Princeton cannot play in the NCAA Division I Football Championship per Ivy League rules.

Recent history
Since the formation of the Ivy League, Princeton has achieved moderate success on the gridiron, with 11 Ivy League championships, three outright and eight shared, 10 Big Three championships since 1955. In 2009, Princeton hired Bob Surace. Surace was an All-Ivy league center at Princeton and graduated in 1990.

Before the start of the 2020 season, the Ivy League announced that no sports would be played until January 1, 2021, at the earliest, because of the COVID-19 pandemic. It has not yet been determined whether the football season will take place in the spring 2021 or not at all. As it turns out, COVID or not, in 2021 the Princeton Tiger are in fact playing a full schedule.

Championships

National championships
Princeton has won 28 national championships from NCAA-designated major selectors. Although they do not compete in the NCAA Division I Football Bowl Subdivision, they maintain claims to titles won at the highest level at the time, with retroactive championships for the 19th century, in which Princeton was declared champion for 20 different seasons in a 30-year span from 1869 to 1899. All except the last title were won in the era prior to the Associated Press poll selecting champions starting in 1936, with the final national championship claim coming from a different poll than the Associated Press. On some occasions, Princeton shared a championships with other teams, with as many as four other teams claiming a championship for certain years, such as 1922, when five teams were given a title in some form with only one tie separating the five unbeaten teams including Princeton.  Princeton claims all 28 titles.

Conference championships
Princeton has won 12 conference championships, with four outright and eight shared.

† Co-championship

Rivalries

Harvard

Princeton leads the series with Harvard 55–48–7.

Penn

Rutgers

Princeton has an historical rivalry with Rutgers (1869–1980).

Yale

Stadium and facilities

Palmer Stadium
In 1914, Princeton built Palmer Stadium, the third college football stadium ever built and what was the second oldest standing college stadium until its demolition in 1996. Palmer Stadium was modeled after the Greek Olympic stadium and seated 45,750 spectators. In the 1990s the university decided to demolish it for a new stadium rather than undertake a long and expensive renovation process, as Harvard had with its stadium in 1984.

Princeton Stadium
During the construction of the new stadium, the Tigers played a season of nine away games, plus a homecoming game against Yale at Giants Stadium in 1997. Princeton Stadium opened on September 19, 1998, and seats 27,773.  After eight years of natural grass fields, FieldTurf artificial playing surface was installed for the 2006 football season and the field was named "Powers Field" in honor of William C. Powers, Princeton class of 1979, who was an All-Ivy punter for the Tigers and donated $10 million to the football program that year.

Practice facilities
The Finney-Campbell practice fields to the east of Princeton University Stadium have been outfitted with FieldTurf.

Future non-conference opponents 
Announced schedules as of January 23, 2023.

References

External links

 

 
American football teams established in 1869
1869 establishments in New Jersey